Dr.George Eutychianus Saigbe Boley (born 7 December 1949) is a Liberian politician and former warlord. He is a member of the Krahn ethnic group.
Boley was a junior minister in the administration of President William Tolbert, but was briefly jailed for his associations with opposition groups. He was released on the morning of the 1980 military coup that brought Samuel Doe to power. Boley later became Minister of Presidential Affairs and Minister of Education under President Doe. After Doe's murder in September 1990, he went into exile in the United States, but was deported by the US government in 2012, after being accused of committing atrocities during the civil war including commanding armed child soldiers. He returned to Liberia and took over the leadership of the Liberia Peace Council (LPC), a rebel group that participated in the Liberian Civil War. Boley spent two years in U.S. custody.

Boley participated in the country's first post-war presidential election, held on 19 July 1997. Representing the National Democratic Party of Liberia (NDPL), he won only 1.26% of the vote.

In 2010, Boley was detained in the US over reported immigration charges. The former leader of the Liberian Peace Council (LPC) who committed human rights abuses during the Liberian civil war in the 1990s was deported to Liberia in March 2012, by U.S. Immigration and Customs Enforcement (ICE) who investigated the human rights allegation and win the former warlord's removal from the United States.

In the 2017 national election, Boley was elected to the house of Representatives in Liberia.

References

Living people
Liberian rebels
African warlords
Candidates for President of Liberia
National Democratic Party of Liberia politicians
1949 births
Krahn people
Education Ministers of Liberia
20th-century Liberian politicians
21st-century Liberian politicians
Members of the Council of State

Prisoners and detainees of the United States federal government
War criminals